The Porcelain Tower may refer to:

Porcelain Tower of Nanjing
The Porcelain Tower (music), a guitar piece by Nikita Koshkin